It Happened in Harlem is an American musical comedy film directed by Bud Pollard and starring Chris Columbus, Phil Gomez, and Nicky O'Daniel. The film was partly shot at Smalls Paradise and released in 1945.

The film includes performances by various musical acts including Dotty Rhodes and "Pitter-Patter" Pitts (Juanita Pitts). Rhodes was a dancer at the Cotton Club. Pitts was a female tap dancer who dressed and danced like a man.

The 30-minute film relies on a thin plot to showcase various performers. Stills and advertising for the film survive.

Plot
A very popular singer is drawing large crowds to his Smalls Paradise performances when he receives his draft notice. Ed Smalls then begins the task of auditioning someone to replace him.  A somewhat unknown young singer with a loyal following tries to audition for the job but is not considered.  One of his very loyal fans goes to Smalls to convince the owner to give the young man a chance.

Cast

Christopher Columbus (musician)
Phil Gomez as Frankie, the soda jerk
Nicky O'Daniel as Little Miss Brown
Juanita 'Pitter-Patter' Pitts as "Pitter-Patter" Pitts		
Dotty Rhodes as self		
Slick and Slack as self			
Milton Woods as Billy Bond
George Wiltshire as Ed Smalls of Smalls Paradise
The Paradise Chorus

References

External links

1945 films
1945 musical comedy films
Jazz films
Films set in Harlem
African-American musical comedy films
American black-and-white films
1940s American films